This article presents a list of the historical events and publications of Australian literature during 1926.

Books 
 Mary Grant Bruce – The Tower Rooms
 Carlton Dawe – The Forbidden Shrine
 Jean Devanny
 The Butcher Shop
 Lenore Divine
 Mabel Forrest – Gaming Gods
 Mary Gaunt – The Forbidden Town
 Jack McLaren
 The Hidden Lagoon
 Isle of Escape : A Story of the South Seas
 Katharine Susannah Prichard
 The Wild Oats of Han
 Working Bullocks
 Steele Rudd – The Romance of Runnibede
 Nevil Shute – Marazan

Short stories 
 Xavier Herbert – "The Maniac and the Full Moon"
 Vance Palmer – "The Birthday"
 Katharine Susannah Prichard – "The Curse"
 Steele Rudd – The Rudd Family

Children's and Young Adult fiction 
 Mary Grant Bruce – Robin
 W. M. Fleming – Bunyip Told Me
 Ethel Turner – Funny
 Lilian Turner – The Happy Heriots

Poetry 

 Jack Lindsay – The Passionate Neatherd : a lyric sequence
 Dorothea Mackellar – Fancy Dress and Other Verse
 Furnley Maurice – "Beauty of the World"
 Myra Morris – "The Pallid Cuckoo"
 John Shaw Neilson 
 "The Birds Go By"
 "The Flight of the Weary"
 "The Gentle Water Bird"
 Nettie Palmer – "The Mystery Man"
 Kenneth Slessor – Earth-Visitors : Poems

Births 

A list, ordered by date of birth (and, if the date is either unspecified or repeated, ordered alphabetically by surname) of births in 1926 of Australian literary figures, authors of written works or literature-related individuals follows, including year of death.

 31 July – Ian Moffitt, novelist (died 2000)

Deaths 

A list, ordered by date of death (and, if the date is either unspecified or repeated, ordered alphabetically by surname) of deaths in 1926 of Australian literary figures, authors of written works or literature-related individuals follows, including year of birth.

 6 June – Henry Tate, poet (born 1873)
19 July – Ada Cambridge, novelist and poet (born 1844)

See also 
 1926 in poetry
 List of years in literature
 List of years in Australian literature
1926 in literature
1925 in Australian literature
1926 in Australia
1927 in Australian literature

References

Literature
Australian literature by year
20th-century Australian literature